A strike of streetcar operators took place in Pensacola, Florida from April 5 to May 13, 1908. It was staged by employees of the Pensacola Electric Company over a company rule requiring workers whom the company had suspended for whatever reason to report to the company's car barn thrice daily for a roll call. During the 39-day strike, open violence erupted in Pensacola's streets, resulting in at least one death, after which martial law was declared and the state militia was sent to provide security to the company strikebreakers.

References

1908 labor disputes and strikes 
Streetcar strikes in the United States
1908 in Florida
Labor disputes in Florida
Rail transportation labor disputes in the United States
History of Pensacola, Florida
Riots and civil disorder in Florida